Marías is a barrio in the municipality of Aguada, Puerto Rico. Its population in 2010 was 1,997.

History
Puerto Rico was ceded by Spain in the aftermath of the Spanish–American War under the terms of the Treaty of Paris of 1898 and became an unincorporated territory of the United States. In 1899, the United States Department of War conducted a census of Puerto Rico finding that the population of Marías barrio was 746.

Sectors
Barrios (which are like minor civil divisions) in turn are further subdivided into smaller local populated place areas/units called sectores ("sectors" in English). The types of sectores may vary, from normally sector to urbanización to reparto to barriada to residencial, among others.

The following sectors are in Marías barrio:

,

Earthquakes
During the 2019-2020 Puerto Rico earthquakes the Lydia Meléndez School in Asomante barrio served as a refuge for residents of Cerro Gordo, Marías and Atalaya (nearby barrios), who had to leave their damaged homes.

See also

 List of communities in Puerto Rico
 List of barrios and sectors of Aguada, Puerto Rico

References

External links
 

Barrios of Aguada, Puerto Rico